The 2015 UCLA Bruins baseball team represents the University of California, Los Angeles in the 2015 NCAA Division I baseball season.  The Bruins compete in the Pac-12 Conference, and plays their home games in Jackie Robinson Stadium.  John Savage is in his eleventh season as head coach.  The Bruins are coming off a season in which they were 25-30-1 (12-18 Pac-12), near the bottom of the Pac-12 Conference standings.

This season, the Bruins completed the regular season with a 42–14 record and were awarded the No. 1 seed in the 2015 NCAA Division I baseball tournament and as the host of the Los Angeles Regional. They played against the Cal State Bakersfield Roadrunners, and the Maryland Terrapins, beginning on May 29. They ended the season by losing the series to Maryland 1–2 in the final regional game.

Ranking movements

Awards and honors
 June 5, 2015 – Relief pitcher David Berg  was named the National Collegiate Baseball Writers Association (NCBWA) District IX Player of the Year.

UCLA Bruins in the 2015 MLB Draft
The following members of the UCLA Bruins baseball program were drafted in the 2015 Major League Baseball Draft.

References

External links
Official website

Ucla Bruins
UCLA Bruins baseball seasons
UCLA
UCLA
Pac-12 Conference baseball champion seasons